West Buffalo Township is a township in Union County, Pennsylvania, United States. The population was 2,820 at the 2020 census.

History
The Hayes Bridge was added to the National Register of Historic Places in 1980.

Geography
According to the United States Census Bureau, the township has a total area of 38.0 square miles (98.4 km2), of which 38.0 square miles (98.4 km2)  is land and 0.03% is water.

West Buffalo Township is bordered by Lycoming County to the north, White Deer and Buffalo Townships to the east, Mifflinburg and Limestone Township to the south and Lewis Township to the west.

Demographics

As of the census of 2000, there were 2,795 people, 993 households, and 753 families residing in the township.  The population density was 73.6 people per square mile (28.4/km2).  There were 1,149 housing units at an average density of 30.2/sq mi (11.7/km2).  The racial makeup of the township was 98.10% White, 0.43% African American, 0.25% Native American, 0.32% Asian, 0.25% from other races, and 0.64% from two or more races. Hispanic or Latino of any race were 0.97% of the population.

There were 993 households, out of which 39.5% had children under the age of 18 living with them, 64.0% were married couples living together, 6.8% had a female householder with no husband present, and 24.1% were non-families. 20.2% of all households were made up of individuals, and 9.0% had someone living alone who was 65 years of age or older.  The average household size was 2.81 and the average family size was 3.24.

In the township the population was spread out, with 30.6% under the age of 18, 8.5% from 18 to 24, 30.3% from 25 to 44, 20.7% from 45 to 64, and 9.9% who were 65 years of age or older.  The median age was 34 years. For every 100 females, there were 101.7 males.  For every 100 females age 18 and over, there were 99.9 males.

The median income for a household in the township was $40,000, and the median income for a family was $43,654. Males had a median income of $30,464 versus $21,307 for females. The per capita income for the township was $17,173.  About 6.0% of families and 6.8% of the population were below the poverty line, including 5.3% of those under age 18 and 16.6% of those age 65 or over.

References

Populated places established in 1769
Townships in Union County, Pennsylvania
Townships in Pennsylvania